RAC Arena is the busiest venue in Western Australia, with many local, regional and international artists having staged their performance at the arena. All events are arranged in an chronological order below while non-concert entertainment events are also included.

References 

Australian entertainment-related lists
Entertainment events in Australia
Lists of events in Australia
Lists of events by venue
Events in Perth, Western Australia
Perth, Western Australia-related lists